Juniata College is a private liberal arts college in Huntingdon, Pennsylvania. Founded in 1876 as a co-educational normal school, it was the first college started by members of the Church of the Brethren as a center for vocational learning for those who could not afford formal education. Today, Juniata has about 1,600 students from 42 states and territories and 45 countries.

History

Huntingdon Normal School, a normal school, was established by a spry young Huntingdon physician, Dr. Andrew B. Brumbaugh, and his two cousins, Henry and John Brumbaugh.  Henry provided a second-story room over his local print shop for classes, while John lodged and fed the college's first teacher, Jacob M. Zuck. Andrew was to "provide students and furniture".  Juniata's first classes were held on April 17, 1876, with Zuck teaching Rebecca Cornelius, Maggie D. Miller, and Gaius M. Brumbaugh, the only son of Andrew Brumbaugh.

In 1877, the school changed its name to Brethren Normal School.  At this time Zuck also discussed adding a "Scientific Course" and issuing "Certificates of Graduation". In 1879, classes moved into Founder's Hall, the school's first permanent building on the present-day campus then only known as "The Building".  On May 11 of same year, Jacob Zuck died from pneumonia at age 32 when he insisted on sleeping in the then unfinished Founders Hall without a heater.  James Quinter was then chosen to lead the school as the school's first president.

In 1894, due to a ruling at the Brethren Church's Annual Meeting against using the term "Brethren" in naming a school, the college was renamed Juniata College for the nearby Juniata River, one of the principal tributaries of the Susquehanna River.  The name Juniata College was made the school's legal name in 1896.

In 1895, Dr. Martin Grove Brumbaugh, an 1881 graduate from Brethren Normal (Huntingdon Normal), took over the active presidency of Juniata until 1910.  During and after his tenure, Brumbaugh remained intimately connected to the college and reacquired the college's presidency in 1924, after having served as governor of Pennsylvania from 1915 to 1919 and as commissioner of education to Puerto Rico in 1900.

M. G. Brumbaugh died unexpectedly in 1930 while on vacation in Pinehurst, North Carolina, and was succeeded in his presidency by a former pupil at Juniata, Dr. Charles Calvert Ellis.

Presidents
 James Quinter (1879–1888) 
 H.B. Brumbaugh (1888–1893) 
 M.G. Brumbaugh (1893–1910) 
 I. Harvey Brumbaugh (1910–1924) 
 M. G. Brumbaugh (1924–1930) 
 C.C. Ellis (1930–1943)
 Calvert N. Ellis (1943–1968) 
 John N. Stauffer (1968–1975) 
 Frederick M. Binder (1975–1986) 
 Robert W. Neff (1986–1998) 
 Thomas R. Kepple, Jr. (1998–2013) 
 Jim Troha (2013–present)

Campus
Two new buildings since 2000 include the von Liebig Center for Science and the Suzanne von Liebig Theatre. Founders Hall, the first building on campus, has also been renovated recently. Construction was finished in the summer of 2009 and uses underground geothermal energy to heat and cool the building. This building is recognized as a LEED Gold building.

A newer building project on campus is Nathan Hall, a dormitory named in honor of longtime Juniata employee, Hilda Nathan. Hilda worked in the treasurer's office from 1946 to 1976. The new residence hall, which opened to students for the fall 2014 semester, offers significant improvements in the areas of accessibility, community and sustainability. Nathan Hall has an elevator and is designed for accessibility throughout the building. The space also is designed to foster community with features such as informal gathering spaces and lounges within the building and outside. The dorm also was constructed using "green" technologies such as geothermal heating, energy-efficient lighting, plantings and green spaces. The building also offers a bike shelter to encourage less driving.

The newest building at Juniata College is the Tom and Pat Kepple Integrated Media and Studio Arts Building, or more briefly, Kepple Hall. Opened in 2017, this building includes four separate studio rooms and numerous innovative spaces for students to learn and collaborate in the creation of art. 

Other off-campus sites include the Baker Peace Chapel (designed by Maya Lin) and the "cliffs," which has views of the Juniata River.  The college also owns the Raystown Field Station, a 365-acre (1.48 km2) reserve on Raystown Lake, which includes an LEED Gold building and two lodges for semester-long residential programs, often focused on environmental topics.

Carnegie Hall was completed in 1907, paid for in part by a grant from U.S. Steel magnate Andrew Carnegie and served as a library for Juniata until 1963, when the college's current L.A. Beeghly Library was completed. The Museum houses a permanent collection, which includes works from the Hudson River School, American portrait miniatures, as well as Old Master paintings and prints. The Museum hosts regional, national, and international exhibitions.

Academics

Program of emphasis
Juniata College features a "Program of Emphasis" rather than the common academic major.  Within a certain course framework, students choose and create their own Program of Emphasis and graduate with a degree in it.  There are designated Programs of Emphasis that follow a set of courses (e.g., Environmental Science, Communication and Anthropology, etc.) or students may create their own with the approval of two faculty advisors.

Areas of study
Juniata is a liberal arts institution.  It has programs in a variety of areas, from the natural sciences to the arts, social sciences, and humanities.  Many students who enter Juniata for the strong science programs, however, find that they enjoy world culture, international programs, peace studies, politics, or a variety of other disciplines.  This varied combination allows students to explore different facets of the world.

The school has a 79% graduation rate; of those, 96% do so within four years.  Juniata also has a 95% acceptance rate to all postgraduate programs, including medical, podiatric, dental, occupational therapy, physical therapy, chiropractic, and law schools.

Since 2003, Juniata alumni include eight Academic All-Americans, five American Physiological Society Undergraduate Research Fellows, 20 Benjamin A. Gilman International Scholars, 19 Fulbright Scholars, 14 Goldwater Fellows, one Pickering Fellow, eight St. Andrew's Society Scholars, and one Davies-Jackson Scholar.  Juniata also perennially places at least one student as a Harvard Summer Research Scholar.

Nearly forty-five percent of Juniata students design their own program of emphasis, and Juniata offers study-abroad opportunities in 22 countries on six continents.

Athletics

Juniata is a Division III collegiate sports institution.  It is well known for its volleyball program (Men's and Women's) and is also a charter member of the Landmark Conference.  Juniata athletes compete in the Landmark Conference except for volleyball and football.  The Juniata Men's Volleyball Team competes in the Continental Volleyball Conference (formerly it competed in the Eastern Intercollegiate Volleyball Association winning several titles under, both, Division I and Division III sanctioning).  The Juniata Eagles Football Squad is a member of the Centennial Conference.  Juniata had a school record of five Academic All-Americans in 2004–2005 academic year and 55 All-American honors since 1998.

In addition, "College Hill" sports 3 National Championships in Women's Volleyball (2004, 2006, & 2022).  Men's Volleyball boasts one EIVA Championship as an NCAA Division I exception (1992) and 6 National Championships as a Division III powerhouse (1998, 2004, 2005, 2006, 2007 & 2009).

The Goal Post Trophy goes to the winner of the annual football game with rival Susquehanna University.  It is a section of the goal post that was torn down after the 1952 Juniata-Susquehanna game.  The visiting Indians (now Eagles) upset the Crusaders in Selinsgrove, and Juniata fans tore down the goal post after the game.  At roughly 5 feet tall, it is one of the tallest trophies in college football.

Student life

Annual events
Juniata College has a tradition of campus-wide events dating back to its founding days.

Lobsterfest, Established: 1988 — Lobsterfest is held at the end of the first week of classes and welcomes students back to campus after summer break. Lobsterfest is a picnic that features lobsters as the main course and live entertainment. In addition, the Student Organization Fair is held during Lobsterfest and gives new students the opportunity to see and sign up for campus clubs.

Storming of the Arch, Established: Mid-1940s — Storming of the Arch takes place on the second Thursday of fall semester and is optional for any new freshmen. Freshmen gather on the center of the campus quad with the intention of charging the Cloister Arch and making it through to the other side, a mission complicated by a group of upperclassmen - "defenders" of the Arch.  Freshmen charge the Arch until they are all knocked down or someone gets through the gauntlet of upperclassmen. To date, only one student has made it through the Arch, a 2018 graduate, Blair Altland. Storming of the Arch was canceled in the mid-1990s due to the number of students being injured but was reinstated by several officers of the Men's rugby team who reorganized it as a charity event.
Mountain Day, Established: 1896 — Mountain Day is the oldest tradition at Juniata and occurs on an unannounced fall day.  The specific date of Mountain Day is not known to students nor faculty until the morning of the event; however, its possible date is a constant source of campus speculation.  On Mountain day, all classes are canceled and both students and faculty are shuttled to Raystown Lake, a popular destination in the area.  The day includes a picnic lunch, nature walks, crafts, music, swimming, boating, and a class vs. class tug-of-war.
Homecoming Weekend, Established: 1923 — Homecoming features alumni reunion activities, sporting events, and a class spirit competition. A unique aspect of Juniata's Homecoming celebration is the presentation of the Community Contribution Awards during half-time of the football game rather than having a Homecoming king and queen.  The award recognizes students who have made outstanding community service contributions, both on-campus and in their local communities.
Family Weekend, Established: 1936 — Usually occurring on a weekend in September, Family Weekend is a chance for students' parents and families to visit the campus. The weekend is filled with activities such as picnics, sporting events, cultural events, tours, etc.
Mr. Juniata Pageant, Established: 1997 — Sponsored by Circle K, the Mr. Juniata Pageant is a tongue-in-cheek spoof of beauty pageants with men from each class competing for the coveted Mr. Juniata crown. The categories include take-offs of formal wear, talent-showing, and interviews.
Madrigal dinner, Established: 1970 — Madrigal Dinner is one of the most popular traditions, with 600–700 students attending, and occurs on the last Saturday of fall semester.  This holiday tradition starts with a meal served to the students by the faculty and staff of their choosing. After dinner,  guests are entertained with performances by members of the campus community and the group participates in a holiday carol sing. This sing-along culminates with the singing of "The Twelve Days of Christmas" with various sections of the dining hall acting out the different parts of the song. Tickets for the sections are sold first-come, first-served and students camp out during the week(s) prior in order to acquire their desired section (the "Five Golden Rings" section is very popular). The Madrigal "line" is typically an elaborate tent city on the lawn around the campus center. It is tradition for some to play pranks on the "line." These pranks in past years have included: blowing air horns throughout the night, water balloons, flooding the lawn where the tents are located, playing recorded animal sounds, and gluing tent zippers shut.
Pig Roast, Established: 1986 — Pigroast is an annual barbecue held at Raystown Lake and is sponsored by the Men's rugby team with the support of the Women's Rugby team. This barbecue also serves as an opportunity for the men's rugby club to play a match against the alumni who return for the event. It occurs the weekend before finals week and serves as the last hurrah for students; particularly the senior class. Pig Roast started as a replacement activity after the school banned the annual Raft Regatta, another event held by the rugby teams. [note: although Pig Roast is very popular, it is not officially sponsored by the college]
Liberal Arts Symposium, also known as Mountain Day of the Mind, is an annual event when classes are cancelled during the spring semester so that students can present their research and projects to the Juniata community

People

Notable alumni of Juniata include:

Frank Vogel, 1994, NBA Coach 
Pat Malone, 1923, MLB pitcher, Chicago Cubs 1928–34, NY Yankees 1935–37, 1 of 2 pitchers in modern era to hit at least 1 HR in 1st 5 MLB seasons ('28-'32). 
Francis Harvey Green, 1931, Chair of English at West Chester University, Headmaster of Pennington School
Morley J. Mays, 1932, former President of Elizabethtown College
Chuck Knox, 1954, former National Football League head coach, Los Angeles Rams, Buffalo Bills and Seattle Seahawks, also the NFL's fifth winningest coach
Wayne M. Meyers, 1957, President of the International Leprosy Association, physician, researcher, medical missionary, author of medical articles, books, and book chapters, and humanitarian
 Ronald Blanck, 1963, former Surgeon General of the United States Army, Chairman of the Board of Regents of the Uniformed Services University of the Health Sciences.
Janet Kauffman, 1967, author of Five on Fiction and nine other books
William Daniel Phillips, 1970, atomic physicist, National Institute of Standards and Technology, jointly awarded Nobel Prize in Physics in 1997 for his contributions to laser cooling.
Michael Trim, 1976, producer and cinematographer for the Showtime original series Weeds and executive producer and director of photography for the Netflix series Orange Is the New Black.
John Kuriyan, 1980, 2005 winner of the Richard Lounsbery Award, Howard Hughes Investigator and Chancellor's Professor of Biochemistry & Molecular Biology at the University of California Berkeley.
Heidi Cullen, Chief Scientist for Climate Central and leads the World Weather Attribution program. Served as The Weather Channel's first on-air climate expert and helped create Forecast Earth.
Harriet Smith Windsor, Secretary of State for the State of Delaware from 2001-2009

Notable faculty of Juniata include:
 Fayette Avery McKenzie, Professor of Sociology (1925–1941), one of the most prominent educators of the Progressive Era, devoted his professional life to the uplift of Native Americans and Black people in the United States and also to adult education.
 Donald Deskey, instructor in art (1923–1925), who designed the interior for the Rockefeller Center Radio City Music Hall and a variety of products for Procter & Gamble.
 Regina Lamendella, Associate Professor of Biology (2012-present), who is widely recognized for her contributions to omics for applied studies of microbiology.

Other:
 Frank Vogel, head coach, Los Angeles Lakers. At Juniata College, Vogel was a starter for the Division III basketball team. In 1994, Vogel transferred to the University of Kentucky. Vogel served as student manager for the Kentucky Wildcats men's basketball team then coached by Rick Pitino in the 1994–95 season.

References

External links
Official website
Official athletics website
A History of the Juniata Valley, vol. 1, National Historical Association, Harrisburg, PA, 1936.

 
Universities and colleges affiliated with the Church of the Brethren
Educational institutions established in 1876
Universities and colleges in Huntingdon County, Pennsylvania
1876 establishments in Pennsylvania
Huntingdon, Pennsylvania
Liberal arts colleges in Pennsylvania
Private universities and colleges in Pennsylvania
Protestant universities and colleges in North America